Joshua James Duggar (born March 3, 1988) is an American convicted sex offender and former reality television personality from the TLC series 19 Kids and Counting. The eldest of Michelle and Jim Bob Duggar's nineteen children, Duggar was the executive director of FRC Action, a lobbying political action committee sponsored by the Family Research Council, from June 2013 to May 2015. He left this position when news broke that he had molested multiple underage girls, including a victim under five years old, when he was aged 14–15.

These revelations led to the cancellation of 19 Kids and Counting on July 16, 2015. Duggar's publicity woes were named one of the "10 Big Scandals of 2015" by USA Today, and The Washington Post listed Duggar as one of the fifteen most hated people on the Internet for that year.

On April 29, 2021, Duggar was arrested by U.S. Marshals on charges of receiving and possessing child pornography. He was found guilty on all charges on December 9, 2021. He was sentenced to over 12 years in prison on May 25, 2022.

Early life
Josh Duggar was born on March 3, 1988, in the city of Tontitown in Washington County, Arkansas, to James Robert and Michelle Annette Ruark Duggar. Duggar was homeschooled and passed Arkansas's state test for a general equivalency diploma at the age of 16. He did not attend college.

Career

Reality television personality
Starting in 2005, Duggar appeared on a number of reality television shows about his family, beginning with a program on Discovery Health when he was aged 17. The most prominent of these programs was the TLC series 19 Kids and Counting, which debuted in September 2008. Duggar's wedding was featured in an episode broadcast on January 25, 2009, which included the planning, preparation, rehearsal, ceremony and reception. Duggar and his wife have stated they saved their first kiss for their wedding day.

Multiple episodes document Duggar's children, including: "GrandDuggar's First Birthday", airing December 7, 2010, where Duggar celebrates his daughter Mackynzie's first birthday and announces the expected birth of their second child; "First Grandson", airing June 19, 2011, which featured Duggar and his wife introducing their second child, Michael James; and "GrandDuggar Makes 3!", airing June 16, 2013, a Father's Day special introducing the Duggars' third baby, Marcus Anthony. A special titled "Josh & Anna: Our Story" aired on October 22, 2013, reviewed the couple's first five years of marriage. Duggar and his wife announced the expected birth of their fourth child on an episode titled "Anna's Having A...", which aired May 12, 2015. The episode included the Duggars announcing the ultrasound showed they were having another girl.

Political activity 
When Duggar was a teenager, his father, Jim Bob Duggar, was a two-term Republican member of the Arkansas House of Representatives. Duggar has also been active in conservative politics; while running a car dealership he worked as a part-time political consultant in 2007 under the business name Strategic Political Services. In 2008, he worked on the Republican presidential primary campaign of former Arkansas Governor Mike Huckabee. In 2012, Duggar addressed rallies for the Republican presidential candidate Rick Santorum of Pennsylvania.

From June 2013 to May 2015, he was executive director of FRC Action, a political action and lobbying organization sponsored by the Family Research Council. When describing his position with the organization, he stated that he would be focused on "engaging the grassroots and taking the message of faith, family and freedom all across America". FRC president Tony Perkins said that by hiring Duggar they hoped to appeal to more young people by tapping into the popularity of 19 Kids and Counting. He further stated, "The big part of Josh's focus is going to be building our grass-roots across the country". While working at FRC Action, conservative Republican candidates valued Duggar as a way to advance their messages to his constituents. He campaigned for Senate candidates in Kansas, Mississippi, and Virginia before the 2014 midterm elections.

Duggar described his family as the "epitome of conservative values" and advocated for what he termed "family-centered" and conservative Christian viewpoints, including opposition to abortion, divorce, and gay marriage. He has been referred to as an "anti-gay activist" by GLAAD, a pro-LGBT rights organization.

Molestation charges

2006 
In 2004 and 2006, the first four television specials featuring the Duggar family were released. In December 2006, the family was scheduled to appear on The Oprah Winfrey Show. At this time, an anonymous source emailed Oprah Winfrey's production company, Harpo Studios, and called the Arkansas Child Abuse Hotline to reveal Duggar's past sexual misconduct toward minors. Winfrey's producers alerted the Department of Human Services and canceled the Duggar family's appearance on the show.

As a result of these reports, an investigation by Springdale police was launched. Investigators spoke to Duggar's parents and several other family members, with the family describing the sexual misconduct that occurred in 2002 and 2003. The family reported that no further incidents had occurred since Duggar returned to the home in late 2003. Family members interviewed by police said that they felt safe in their home and had forgiven Duggar for his past behavior.

Under Arkansas state law, child sexual abuse charges must be filed within three years of being reported to a police officer to be within the statute of limitations. In July 2003, Duggar's father had taken him to meet Joseph Truman Hutchens, an Arkansas State Trooper and family acquaintance. Because of this contact, the statute had started at that time and had run out by the time of the 2006 investigation. As a result, no charges could be filed. Hutchens was himself convicted in 2012 of charges relating to child pornography, and was sentenced to 56 years in prison.

2015 
On May 21, 2015, a report by the magazine In Touch Weekly stated that Jim Bob Duggar had told the Arkansas State Police that Josh had molested five underage girls between 2002 and 2003, when he was 14 and 15 years old. According to a redacted police report obtained via a Freedom of Information Act request, four of the five molestation victims were Duggar's siblings. Jim Bob reported he had learned in March 2002 that Josh had touched the breasts and genital region of his sisters on multiple occasions while they were sleeping. Both parents stated that they were made aware of the incidents when he confessed and that the girls were initially unaware the abuse had occurred. Jim Bob stated that Josh was disciplined at home. In March 2003, Duggar's parents learned of additional incidents and victims, which included the touching of a babysitter, reaching under the dress of a younger sister who was in his lap, and cornering a sister in the laundry room to reach under her clothing. The Duggars had also been told the abuse included a much younger sister, who, according to the Duggars, "didn't understand she had been improperly touched". At this time, Duggar's father brought the issue to the elders of their church.

Jim Bob informed police that he had enrolled Josh in a program consisting of counseling and physical labor after consulting with his church's leadership. Michelle stated he was sent away from home for a period of three months to work for a family friend who was remodeling a building. Later reports suggest that Josh may have been sent to a facility in Little Rock owned by the Institute in Basic Life Principles (IBLP), a Christian ministry and training program founded by Bill Gothard, a Duggar family friend. It has not been established that the IBLP center in Little Rock was open for counseling during the time Josh was there, if the building was renovated during this time period, or he was assisting with any such renovation.

When Josh returned home in July 2003, his father took him to meet Joseph Truman Hutchens, an Arkansas State Trooper and family acquaintance. According to Josh and his parents, the meeting was the first time any law enforcement authority was made aware of the abuse. According to Jim Bob, Josh admitted to Hutchens that he had committed molestation and apologized. Speaking via a lawyer, Hutchens disputed part of the account, saying he was only told of a single act of incestuous molestation and that he would have responded differently if he had known of additional instances and victims. In an interview following this statement, Jim Bob claimed Hutchens was told the entire story. Hutchens did not take any official action but reportedly gave Josh a "stern talk". Under Arkansas state law, law enforcement officers, as mandated reporters, are required to alert the Arkansas Child Abuse Hotline when learning of sexual abuse. Hutchens was later arrested and convicted on unrelated charges of child pornography and is currently serving a 56-year prison sentence.

Though Josh Duggar's misconduct was largely unknown to the public before 2015, a blogger writing in 2007 and identified only as "Alice" referred to the canceled Oprah Winfrey Show appearance and stated that staff for the program had been told he was a "child molester". The allegation circulated online for years but was not publicly corroborated until the In Touch article revealed the police report. Immediately after the article was published, an unidentified victim who was reportedly still a minor requested that any remaining products of the investigation be destroyed. State judge Stacey Zimmerman granted this request to protect the unidentified victim's privacy.

Duggar resigned his position at FRC Action on May 21, 2015, on the same day the In Touch article was published. He stated that he "acted inexcusably" as a teen and said he was "deeply sorry" for what he called his wrongdoings. In response to his resignation, FRC president Tony Perkins stated, "Josh believes that the situation will make it difficult for him to be effective in his current work. We believe this is the best decision for Josh and his family at this time. We will be praying for everyone involved."

In Touch reported in a June 3, 2015, article that another police report obtained by the magazine revealed that Josh had confessed to his father, on three separate occasions, to committing child molestation, which had involved a much younger sister and seven incidents. The article also noted that the family waited at least sixteen months before reporting the abuse to authorities.

Testimony from both Jim and Bobye Holt revealed that the sexual abuse inside the Duggar family home was far more extensive than Jim Bob and Michelle Duggar claimed during their 2015 interview with Megyn Kelly. The Holts revealed that the incidents were widespread and that Josh had touched his siblings inappropriately multiple times. Jim Bob and Michelle once claimed Josh’s victims were initially unaware anything had happened to them. The Holts revealed that Jim Bob and Michelle’s past statements were untrue. They testified that at least one of the victims reported an incident.

Debate over release of police reports
The Arkansas Freedom of Information Act states that the records of a juvenile "shall remain confidential" and "shall not be subject to disclosure under the FOI". Arkansas State Senator Bart Hester called for Springdale Police Chief Kathy O'Kelley to be fired, saying that she had re-victimized Duggar's victims by releasing his records. Springdale city attorney Ernest Cate defended the release of the records, saying that while Duggar was a minor at the time of the alleged incidents, he was 18 in December 2006 when the police report was filed. He added that under these circumstances, the records could be released once minors' names, as well as any potentially identifying pronouns, were redacted. Zimmerman ordered all copies of the report destroyed on May 21, 2015.

On June 5, 2015, Duggar's sisters Jessa and Jill gave an interview to Megyn Kelly on Fox News, discussing the abuse and the reports' release. Jessa called Duggar's actions as a teen "very wrong" and stated, "I do want to speak up in his defense against people who are calling him a child molester or a pedophile or a rapist, as some people are saying ... [T]hat is so overboard and a lie really ... I mean, people get mad at me for saying that, but I can say this because I was one of the victims." She further stated that "the system was set up to protect kids ... it's greatly failed", and that the week preceding the interview had been "a thousand times worse for us" than the sexual abuse. Jill called the release of the police reports "a revictimization".

Admissions following Ashley Madison breach
On August 20, 2015, following the online posting of information from the Ashley Madison data breach, which included records of credit card transactions under his name, Duggar and his parents released a statement on the family website in which he admitted to watching pornography on the Internet and being unfaithful to his wife. According to the material obtained in the data breach, Duggar's credit card was used to pay $986.76 for two Ashley Madison subscriptions starting in February 2013, which were cancelled in May 2015 shortly after the molestation allegations surfaced.

The statement contained the following: "I have been the biggest hypocrite ever. While espousing faith and family values, I have secretly over the last several years been viewing pornography on the Internet and this became a secret addiction and I became unfaithful to my wife" ... "the last few years, while publicly stating I was fighting against immorality in our country I was hiding my own personal failures". The reference to pornography was later removed from the website.

On August 25, 2015, Duggar checked himself into a rehabilitation facility that his family described as a "long-term treatment center". The facility was later confirmed in media reports as Reformers Unanimous, which describes itself as "a learning atmosphere where the addicted can be discipled in an environment that is much like a greenhouse".

Sexual assault allegations
In November 2015, pornographic actress Danica Dillon filed suit against Duggar, claiming he had "assaulted her to the point of causing her physical and emotional injuries" during an episode of consensual sex at a Philadelphia strip club earlier in the year. According to Dillon, the incident occurred after she had provided $600 worth of lap dances to Duggar. Dillon was seeking $500,000 in damages from him. In February 2016, Dillon chose to drop the lawsuit.

2021 arrest, trial, and conviction
On April 29, 2021, U.S. Marshals arrested Duggar on federal charges of receiving and possessing child pornography. Prosecutors allege that Duggar obtained the images in May 2019 and it was acknowledged that a federal investigation by the office of the U.S. Attorney for the Western District of Arkansas had been previously recommended after Duggar's used car dealership Wholesale Motorcars was searched by U.S. Homeland Security agents in November 2019 as a part of an initiative launched by the U.S. Department of Justice to protect children from sexual abuse and exploitation. The federal grand jury's indictment accuses Duggar of having "knowingly" received pornographic images of children who were under 12 years old. Following his arrest, Duggar was booked into the Washington County Jail. On April 30, 2021, Duggar pleaded not guilty to one count each of charges of receiving and possessing child pornography, with his attorneys indicating that he would "fight back in the courtroom" against the charges.

U.S. Chief Magistrate Judge Erin L. Wiedemann said that, if Duggar were to be awarded bail, he would have to be "in a residence where there's no minor in the home". At that time, Duggar's six children were under the age of 11, and his wife Anna was pregnant with a seventh child. The seventh child was born in October 2021. Duggar was granted conditional bail at a bond hearing on May 5, and he was released from jail and transferred into the custody of a third-party custodian. As part of the conditions for his bail, Duggar was permitted to have contact with his children only in the presence of his wife. He was required to wear an ankle monitor, have a probation officer's permission to leave the third-party custodians' home, could not access the internet, and could not be inside a residence where firearms were stored.

Gerald Faulkner, a special agent for Homeland Security Investigations, stated the files on the computer were "in the top five of the worst of the worst that I've ever had to examine". One of the videos allegedly in Duggar's possession, created by Peter Scully, depicts the rape and torture of an 18-month-old toddler.

Trial 
Duggar's trial date, originally set for July 6, was rescheduled for November 30, 2021. He did not meet an October deadline to accept a plea deal.

As of October 2021, Duggar's lawyers attempted to use procedural nuisances to get the case against him dismissed. The judge described the action of the lawyers as "frivolous". Further attempts by Duggar's lawyers to suppress evidence against him similarly were denied by a judge. The prosecution wanted to bring up sexual assault accusations made against Duggar when he was a young teenager; the defense alleged these charges were irrelevant and could prejudice a jury. A pretrial hearing was held on November 18, at which the judge demanded an evidentiary hearing. The evidentiary hearing was held on November 29 in a Fayetteville court to determine if Duggar's father Jim Bob Duggar and family friend Bobye Holt could testify as prosecution witnesses during his trial. During this three-hour hearing, both took the stand, with Holt testifying that Josh Duggar had fondled four younger girls since the age of 12.

The trial began on November 30 with jury selection. The same day, Duggar's lawyer filed a motion urging the presiding judge to dismiss "any further testimony" from Holt. On December 1, 2021, opening statements took place after trial judge Timothy L. Brooks denied the bid from Duggar's defense counsel to have past abuse allegations dismissed as trial evidence. The same day, Detective Amber Kalmer of the Little Rock Police Department became the first witness of the trial to testify. On December 3, an official from the Department of Justice testified that the hard drive in Duggar's computer had been partitioned into two sections: one which had Windows installed that he used mainly for business, and the second with Linux installed, which he used to download, access and share child pornography. The accountability software Covenant Eyes had been installed on the Windows side and was set to alert Duggar's spouse when pornography was viewed, but the software could not detect what was accessed while the computer was using Linux. Husband and wife Jim and Bobye Holt were called as a witnesses for the prosecution. Jim Holt testified that Josh Duggar had asked him how to create the Linux partition on a computer in 2010, while Bobye Holt reiterated the same information that she testified on November 29.

On December 9, 2021, a jury found Duggar guilty of receiving and possessing child pornography.

Sentence 
On May 25, 2022, Duggar was sentenced to 12 years and 7 months in prison. His earliest possible release is August 22, 2032. This will be followed by 20 years of supervised release, during which he must register as a sex offender and can have no unsupervised contact with minors, including his own children. He can only access the Internet with the permission of his probation officer, and must agree to monitoring of his online activity. He was fined $10,000 and ordered to pay an additional $40,100 in special assessments.

He had faced up to 20 years in federal prison and a fine of up to $250,000 for each of the two counts.

Aftermath
Multiple Duggar family members and their spouses issued statements following Duggar's conviction. Some celebrated that justice was served and offered prayers for Duggar and his family. On May 17, 2022, Duggar's cousin, Amy King, posted an open letter to Anna Duggar, telling her "there is no shame in divorcing Josh."

A day after Duggar's conviction, news of his sister Jana's child endangerment charge from September 2021 was published. On December 14, 2021, five days after Josh's conviction, Jim Bob Duggar's bid to represent District 7 of the Arkansas State Senate was unsuccessful, finishing third in the Republican primary.

On January 20, 2022, Josh Duggar's legal team filed for acquittal, arguing that the evidence presented at trial did not support conviction.  On May 24, 2022, the federal district court denied Duggar's motion for judgment of acquittal.  On June 3, 2022, Duggar appealed his conviction to the United States Court of Appeals for the Eighth Circuit, which remains pending.

Personal life
On September 26, 2008, Duggar and Anna Renée Keller, both aged 20, were married at the Buford Grove Baptist Church in Hilliard, Florida. They have seven children: three sons and four daughters. His four younger children will still be minors at the time that he is expected to be released from prison. Any visits with his minor children would still have to be supervised.

References

External links
 

Duggar family
Participants in American reality television series
American male criminals
American people convicted of child pornography offenses
American political activists
Activists from Arkansas
Arkansas Republicans
Child sexual abuse in the United States
Incestual abuse
21st-century American criminals
21st-century Baptists
Baptists from Maryland
Baptists from Arkansas
People from Oxon Hill, Maryland
People from Washington County, Arkansas
1988 births
Living people
Protestants from Arkansas
Conservatism in the United States
Sexual abuse scandals in Protestantism
Religious figures convicted of child sexual abuse